Samuel Wilhelm Roos (3 July 1858 - 10 December 1944) was a Finnish Lutheran clergyman and politician, born in Vehmaa. He was a member of the Diet of Finland from 1904 to 1906 and of the Parliament of Finland from 1909 to 1916 and again from 1917 to 1924, representing the Swedish People's Party of Finland (SFP).

References

1858 births
1944 deaths
People from Vehmaa
People from Turku and Pori Province (Grand Duchy of Finland)
Swedish-speaking Finns
19th-century Finnish Lutheran clergy
Swedish People's Party of Finland politicians
Members of the Diet of Finland
Members of the Parliament of Finland (1909–10)
Members of the Parliament of Finland (1910–11)
Members of the Parliament of Finland (1911–13)
Members of the Parliament of Finland (1913–16)
Members of the Parliament of Finland (1917–19)
Members of the Parliament of Finland (1919–22)
Members of the Parliament of Finland (1922–24)
People of the Finnish Civil War (White side)
University of Helsinki alumni
20th-century Finnish Lutheran clergy